The Scandinavian Open Road Race was a single-day road cycling race held in Vårgårda Municipality, Sweden from 1986 to 2009. It was part of UCI Europe Tour as a category 1.2 event from 2005 to 2009.

Winners

References

Cycle races in Sweden
Defunct cycling races in Sweden
UCI Europe Tour races
Recurring sporting events established in 1986
1986 establishments in Sweden
Recurring sporting events disestablished in 2009
2009 disestablishments in Sweden